"Shady Deal at Sunny Acres", starring James Garner and Jack Kelly, remains one of the most famous and widely discussed episodes of the Western comedy television series Maverick. Written by series creator Roy Huggins (teleplay) and Douglas Heyes (story) and directed by Leslie H. Martinson, this 1958 second season episode depicts gambler Bret Maverick (James Garner) being swindled by a crooked banker (John Dehner) after depositing the proceeds from a late-night poker game.  He then surreptitiously recruits his brother Bart Maverick (Jack Kelly) and a host of other acquaintances to mount an elaborate sting operation to recover the money.

As Huggins noted during a lengthy discussion of the episode in his Archive of American Television interview, the first half of the 1973 movie The Sting seems based on Huggins' script.  While Bart and all of the series' recurring characters join forces to energetically flim-flam the banker ("....if you can't trust your banker, who can you trust?"), Bret sits whittling in a rocking chair across the street from the bank every day, responding to the amused and patronizing queries of the local townspeople curious about how he plans to recover his money, "I'm working on it."

"Shady Deal at Sunny Acres" was generally the first episode that Garner mentioned in interviews.

The episode is also the only one featuring brief appearances by all five of the series' early semi-regular recurring characters: Efrem Zimbalist, Jr. as Dandy Jim Buckley, Diane Brewster as Samantha Crawford, Leo Gordon as Big Mike McComb, Richard Long as Gentleman Jack Darby, and Arlene Howell as Cindy Lou Brown.  It proved to be the final series appearance for both Samantha and Dandy Jim because they were each working full-time on new series, Zimbalist in 77 Sunset Strip and Brewster as the schoolteacher in Leave It to Beaver.  Additionally, for Gentleman Jack and Cindy, it was their only appearance in an episode in which Bret also appeared, although they shared not a single scene with Bret—all their dealings on Maverick were with Bart.

Cast
James Garner	... 	Bret Maverick
Jack Kelly	... 	Bart Maverick
John Dehner ... Bates the banker
Efrem Zimbalist, Jr.	... 	Dandy Jim Buckley
Diane Brewster	... 	Samantha Crawford
Leo Gordon	... 	Big Mike McComb
Richard Long	... 	Gentleman Jack Darby
Arlene Howell	... 	Cindy Lou Brown
Regis Toomey	... 	Ben Granville
Karl Swenson	... 	Sheriff Griffen
Joan Young	... 	Susan Granville
Irving Bacon	... 	Employee
Val Benedict	... 	Cowhand
Earle Hodgins	... 	Plunkett
Jonathan Hole	... 	Desk Clerk
J. Pat O'Malley	... 	Ambrose Callahan
Syd Saylor	... 	1st Townsman
Leon Tyler	... 	Henry Hibbs
Edwin Reimers	... 	Announcer (voice)

See also
 Duel at Sundown (Maverick)
 List of Maverick episodes
 Bret Maverick: The Lazy Ace
 The Rockford Files

References

External links

Shady Deal at Sunny Acres in the Internet Movie Database
Shady Deal at Sunny Acres in TV Guide.com
Shady Deal at Sunny Acres in TV.com
 Reviews of "Shady Deal at Sunny Acres"
Roy Huggins' Archive of American Television Interview
Stephen J. Cannell's Archive of American Television explanation of Huggins' approach
Museum of Broadcast Communications: Maverick 
James Garner's Archive of American Television Interview
The Paley Center for Media

1958 American television episodes
Maverick (TV series)